An isolating language is a type of language with a morpheme per word ratio close to one, and with no inflectional morphology whatsoever. In the extreme case, each word contains a single morpheme. Examples of widely spoken isolating languages are Yoruba in West Africa and Vietnamese (especially its colloquial register) in Southeast Asia.

A closely related concept is that of an analytic language, which uses little or no inflection to indicate grammatical relationships. Isolating and analytic languages tend to coincide and are often identified. However, analytic languages such as English may still contain polymorphemic words in part because of the presence of derivational morphemes.

Isolating languages contrast with synthetic languages, where words often consist of multiple morphemes. That linguistic classification is subdivided into the classifications fusional, agglutinative, and polysynthetic, which are based on how the morphemes are combined.

Explanation
Although historically languages were divided into three basic types (isolating, inflectional, agglutinative), the traditional morphological types can be categorized by two distinct parameters:

 morpheme per word ratio (how many morphemes there are per word)
 degree of fusion between morphemes (how separable words' inflectional morphemes are according to units of meaning represented)

A language is said to be more isolating than another if it has a lower morpheme per word ratio.

To illustrate the relationship between words and morphemes, the English term "rice" is a single word consisting of only one morpheme (rice). This word has a 1:1 morpheme per word ratio. In contrast, "handshakes" is a single word consisting of three morphemes (hand, shake, -s). This word has a 3:1 morpheme per word ratio. On average, words in English have a morpheme per word ratio substantially greater than one.

It is perfectly possible for a language to have one inflectional morpheme yet more than one unit of meaning. For example, the Russian word vídyat/видят 'they see' has a morpheme per word ratio of 2:1, having two morphemes: the root vid-/вид-, which conveys the  imperfective aspect meaning, and the inflectional morpheme -yat/-ят which inflects for four units of meaning (3rd person subject, plural subject, present/future tense, indicative mood). Effectively, it has four units of meaning in one inseparable morpheme: -yat/-ят.

Languages that are relatively more isolating have a morpheme per word ratio that approaches 1:1. A purely-isolating language would lack any visible morphology since no word would have an internal compositional structure in terms of word pieces (i.e. morphemes) and so it would lack bound morphemes like affixes.

The morpheme per word ratio is a scalar category ranging from low ratios (approaching 1:1) on the isolating hypothetical pole of the scale, to a high morpheme per word ratio. The greater the overall ratio, the less isolating and the more synthetic the language.

See also
 Analytic language
 Free morpheme
 Linguistic typology
 Synthetic language
 Zero-marking language

References

Further reading
 Sapir, Edward (1921). Chapter 6: "Types of linguistic structure". In Language: An Introduction to the Study of Speech.

 

eo:Lingva tipologio#Analizaj lingvoj